Tioda was a prominent Asturian architect of the 9th century. He worked primarily in Oviedo, where he constructed the church of San Salvador which was later elevated to the rank of cathedral of the Roman Catholic Diocese of Oviedo and the Royal Palace. 

His work was recognised and praised by the kings Alfonso II of Asturias and Ramiro I of Asturias and he was paid by the court to design further buildings. The reconstruction of the San Julián de los Prados was ordered by Alfonso II of Asturias around 830 by Tioda. It is considered one of the greatest works of Asturian art and Asturian architecture and was declared a Historical-Artistic Monument by the Spanish Ministry of Culture in June 1917 and a World Heritage Site by UNESCO on 2 December 1998.

He has been called Spain's first "urbanist". Due to his unusual name, in the past it was suggested that he might have originated from Aachen.

See also
Asturian architecture

References

External links
Tioda in the Enciclopedia de Oviedo.

Spanish architects
People from Asturias
8th-century births
9th-century deaths
People from Oviedo
9th-century architects